Anoxybacillus  is a genus of rod-shaped, spore-forming bacteria from the family of Bacillaceae. Anoxybacillus occur in geothermal springs, manure and milk processing plants.

References

Further reading 
 
 
 

Bacillaceae
Bacteria genera